Miriam's skink (Brachymeles miriamae) is a skink, a lizard in the family Scincidae. The species is endemic to Thailand.

Taxonomy
In 1972 Heyer described Miriam's skink as a new species in a new genus, giving it the scientific name Davewakeum miriamae. In 2011 Siler et al. included the genus Davewakeum in the genus Brachymeles, creating the new combination, Brachymeles miriamae . In 2015 Chan-ard et al. returned the species to the genus Davewakeum.

Etymology
The specific name, miriamae, is in honor of Miriam Heyer, who collected the holotype, and is the wife of American herpetologist W. Ronald Heyer.

The generic name, Davewakeum, is in honor of American herpetologist David B. Wake.

Geographic range
Miriam's skink is found in Nakhon Ratchasima Province, Thailand.

Description
Miriam's skink is limbless.

References

Further reading
Chan-ard, Tanya; Parr, John W. K.; Nabhitabhata, Jarujin (2015). A Field Guide to the Reptiles of Thailand. New York: Oxford University Press. 352 pp. .
Heyer WR (1972). "A New Limbless Skink (Reptilia: Scincidae) from Thailand With Comments on the Generic Status of the Limbless Skinks of Southeast Asia". Fieldiana Zoology 58 (10): 109–129. (Davewakeum, new genus, p. 124, Figures 4–5; D. miriamae, new species, pp. 124–128, Figure 7).

Brachymeles
Reptiles of Thailand
Endemic fauna of Thailand
Reptiles described in 1972